Provolt is an unincorporated community in Jackson County, Oregon, United States.

Provolt post office was named for a pioneer family of the area. The Provolt Store was started about 1875 by Samuel Provolt. The post office was established in 1895 in what was then Josephine County; Mary E. Provolt was the first postmaster. The office was discontinued in 1955.

According to author Ralph Friedman, Provolt's entire business district consists of the historic country store. Provolt, however, also has a grange hall one block south of the store.

References

External links
Historic image of Provolt from Salem Public Library

Unincorporated communities in Jackson County, Oregon
1895 establishments in Oregon
Populated places established in 1895
Unincorporated communities in Oregon